Chișinău is the capital of Moldova. This article gives an overview of street names in the city that refer to famous persons, cities or historic events.

A large number of streets have been named after persons that played an important role in Moldovan history:
 Vasile Alecsandri, Romanian writer
 Nicolae Anestiade
 Gavriil Bănulescu-Bodoni, metropolitan of Romanian orthodox church
 Alexandru cel Bun, Moldavian voivode between 1400 and 1432
 Dimitrie Cantemir, Moldavian voivode
 George Coșbuc, Romanian writer, 1866 - 1918
 Decebal, Dacian king,  87 - 106
 Dosoftei, Moldavian metropolitan
 Mihai Eminescu, Romanian writer
 Yuri Gagarin, first man in space
 Octavian Goga, Romanian poet and politician, 1881 - 1938
 Pan Halippa
 Alexandru Lăpușneanu, prince of Moldavia, 1552 - 1568
 Titu Maiorescu, Romanian writer
 Stefan cel Mare, prince of Moldova between 1457 and 1504
 Alexei Mateevici, Moldavian Romanian poet, 1888 - 1917
 Veronica Micle, Romanian writer
 Petru Movila, metropolitan of Kiev, 1633 - 1646
 Constantin Negruzzi, Romanian writer
 Anton Pann, Wallachian poet and composer, 1790s - 1854
 Vlaicu Pircalab
 Alexander Pushkin, Russian writer
 Alexey Shchusev
 Varlaam, Moldovan metropolitan
 Mihai Viteazul, prince of Moldavia, Wallachia and Transylvania in 1600

Other streets are named after cities in Moldova or elsewhere
 București, capital of neighbouring Romania
 Hîncești, town in Moldova
 Ismail, town in southern Ukraine
 Tighina (or Bender)
 Tiraspol, second largest city in the country, capital of the disputed republic of Transnistria

Some other references:
 Sfatul Țării, the national council that declared the Moldavian Democratic Republic on January 24, 1918

Chișinău
Roads in Moldova
Chisinau